Pumpelly Pillar is located in the Lewis Range, Glacier National Park in the U.S. state of Montana. Located in the Two Medicine region in the southeastern section of Glacier National Park, the peak is likely named after Raphael Pumpelly, who lead the Northern Transcontinental Railway Survey party that crossed Pitamakan Pass in 1883.

See also
 Mountains and mountain ranges of Glacier National Park (U.S.)

References

External links
 Pumpelly Pillar photo: Flickr

Mountains of Glacier County, Montana
Mountains of Glacier National Park (U.S.)
Lewis Range